Christabel Baxendale (1886–after 1953?) was an English violinist and composer "of considerable talent." She was active in the early 1900s until at least 1921 and gave concerts in the London area, sometimes with her older sister, Kathleen Baxendale, who was a soprano opera singer.

Works
Baxendale composed mostly popular songs. Selected works include:
That Merry, Merry May (setting of a poem by Gerald Massey)
Plaintive Melody for violin or viola and piano (1951)
Two little Eyes of blue
You Came To Me

References

1886 births
Year of death missing
Date of death unknown
20th-century classical composers
Women classical composers
English classical composers
20th-century English composers
20th-century English women musicians
20th-century women composers